The Women's Philharmonic (TWP) was a San Francisco-based, professional orchestra founded by Miriam Abrams, Elizabeth Seja Min and Nan Washburn in 1981 and disbanded in 2004.

History
Originally known as the Bay Area Women's Philharmonic, in 1998, the orchestra's repertoire consisted almost entirely of works by more than 150 women, including more than 130 premiere performances and more than 40 commissions. A partial list of TWP's repertoire, compiled by Women's Philharmonic Advocacy, includes 283 works.  TWP's mission was "to change the face of what is played in every concert hall by incorporating works by women composers into the orchestral repertoire." TWP's long list of accomplishments includes multiple awards for Adventurous Programming from ASCAP and the American Symphony Orchestra League.

In 2008, Women's Philharmonic Advocacy was formed "in order to recognize the achievement of The Women's Philharmonic (1980-2004) over their 24 years of activity, to build on this work by advocating for the performance of women composers by orchestras and ensembles, to address the place of women composers (historic and contemporary) in today's repertoire of orchestras and ensembles in the US and internationally, and to present information that highlights the shortage of programming of works by women; the heritage of The Women's Philharmonic emphasizes that this should and can be corrected."

The Philharmonic continues in existence as the Community Women's Orchestra, which was initially founded in 1985 by Nan Washburn as an adjunct to The Women's Philharmonic.

Leadership

Music directors
Elizabeth Seja Min (music director, 1981–1985)
Nan Washburn (artistic director and associate conductor, 1981–1990)
JoAnn Falletta (music director, 1986–1997)
Apo Hsu (music director, 1997–2003)

Guest conductors
Ebrina Alfonso
Gisele Ben-Dor
Sarah Caldwell
Ann Krinitsky
J. Karla Lemon
Jadine Louie
Anne Manson
Marsha Mabrey
Kathleen McGuire
Frances Steiner

Recordings
Baroquen Treasures (Newport Classic, 1990)
 The Women's Philharmonic: Mendelssohn, Schumann (1993, Koch International Classics 7169, reissued 2008)
 Uses of Music in Uttermost Parts: Music by Elinor Armer, Text by Ursula K. Le Guin (1995, Koch International Classics)
The Music of Chen Yi (1996, New Albion Records)
The Music of Florence Price (2001, Koch International Classics 7518, reissued 2008)

Notes and references

Further reading
 The Women's Philharmonic: History, Music, and a Sociological Analysis. (Written in 1995 by Christi Denton, Amy Bohorquez, and Katrina Blomdahl) "The Women's Philharmonic"
 Yip, Alethea. "Symphony Conductor: Picking up the baton at the Women's Philharmonic", AsianWeek, May 30 - June 4, 1997.

External links 
American Symphony Orchestra League official website
Community Women's Orchestra official website
 Women's Philharmonic Advocacy official website
  partial list of The Women's Philharmonic repertoire
I Resound Press digital scores

Disbanded American orchestras
Musical groups established in 1981
Musical groups disestablished in 2004
Women's orchestras
Musical groups from California
Musical groups from San Francisco
1981 establishments in California
2004 disestablishments in California
History of women in California